Fundrise is a Washington, D.C.-based financial technology company founded in 2010 that operates an online investment platform. Fundrise has been labeled as the first company to successfully crowdfund investment into the real estate market.

, Fundrise had originated approximately $1.1 billion in both equity and debt investments deployed across approximately $4.9 billion of real estate property.

History

Fundrise was founded in 2010 by brothers Ben and Dan Miller and launched in 2012 before the passing of the JOBS Act, which enacted securities regulation to streamline the process of equity crowdfunding in the United States. Their father, Herb Miller of Western Development Corp., developed 20 million square feet of real estate based in Washington, D.C. Ben Miller worked as President of Western Development Corp. and Managing Partner of WestMill Capital Partners prior to Fundrise. Prior to Fundrise, Dan Miller worked for Western Development Corp. and also as Managing Partner of WestMill Capital Partners. The brothers founded the company with the idea to allow residents in the D.C. area to invest in real estate development projects they were building. Fundrise's first project, Maketto, in the H Street NE Corridor in Washington D.C. raised $325,000 from 175 investors, where any resident of D.C. or Virginia could invest for as little as $100, making it the first crowdfunded real estate project in the United States.

Early growth 
After the initial project, Fundrise was contacted by real estate companies looking to use the Fundrise platform to raise capital. Soon thereafter, the company expanded its platform to allow conventional real estate investments from commercial developers across the United States.

By May 2014 the company reported to have facilitated $15 million in investments involving 1,000+ investors. One of Fundrise's most publicized investments came in January 2015 when it began offering bonds for the construction of 3 World Trade Center, the location of the third tallest tower at the site of the World Trade Center in lower Manhattan. The initial offering was for $2 million of the $5 million worth of bonds purchased by Fundrise for the financing of the $1 billion project. Bonds were offered for $5,000 each with a 5% tax-free gross annual return for five years.

Fundrise also raised more capital in its first-round of Series A investment than any other crowdfunding company, totaling $38 million. Funding was led by Chinese social networking company Renren who invested $31 million of the total $38 million. Additional Series A investors include Guggenheim Partners, Justin Elghanayan of Rockrose Development Corporation, and James Ratner of Forest City Enterprises. By February 2015, Fundrise had commitments from six institutional investors for an additional $100 million in investment into the company's real estate offerings. In October 2015, co-founder and president Daniel Miller left the company.

In February 2016, Fundrise terminated its senior accountant for allegedly attempting to extort over $1 million from the enterprise over a claim that "the company acted inappropriately concerning two real estate deals." The accountant denied the allegations of extortion and claimed that the termination was retaliation for reporting "serious fraudulant behavior." The company denied the claims and hired an outside audit firm to conduct an investigation into the allegations, which ultimately concluded there was no reasonable basis to the allegations.

eREIT launch 
On December 3, 2015, Fundrise launched the Fundrise Real Estate Investment Trust, the world's first online real estate investment trust or "eREIT" with an initial offering of $50 million pursuant to Regulation A+.

The Fundrise eREIT offering provides prospective investors with the opportunity to invest in an intended portfolio of properties across the United States for a minimum of $1,000. The aim of the eREIT is to use new technology to give both accredited and unaccredited investors the option to invest in U.S. real estate. This financial offering was made possible by the expansion of Regulation A under the JOBS Act.

The company subsequently opened a second eREIT, the Fundrise Equity REIT, in February 2016.

In December 2016, the Fundrise Income eREIT was the first company to raise $50 million, the maximum amount allowed under Regulation A. Later in December 2016, the Fundrise Growth eREIT became the second ever issuer to raise $50 million pursuant to Regulation A.

eFund launch 
In June 2017, Fundrise announced the eFund, a diversified portfolio of for-sale housing in major U.S. cities. The first eFund was the Los Angeles eFund, with an initial offering of $50 million under Regulation A+. In conjunction with the eFund launch, Fundrise introduced a goal-based investing and an advisory service.

Amazon HQ2 
In 2018, Fundrise announced that it had acquired thirty residential properties in the Washington, D.C. area in anticipation of Amazon's HQ2 announcement. Fundrise is establishing the HQ2 DC eFund, to invest as much as $50M in residential properties throughout Washington, D.C.

2021 
In 2021, Fundrise received $300 million in credit from Goldman Sachs to invest in developing single family homes in the Sun Belt.

Awards
Fundrise was selected for the Forbes Fintech 50 list in 2015, 2016, 2017, and 2019. In 2018, Fundrise placed position 35 overall and position 1 in the financial services industry on the Inc. 5,000 list.

See also
 Alternative investment
 Disruptive innovation
 Financial Technology
 Registered Investment Adviser
 Regulation A

References

Further reading

External links
 Fundrise official website

Privately held companies based in Washington, D.C.
Crowdfunding
Real estate companies established in 2010
Real estate services companies of the United States
Investment companies of the United States
American companies established in 2010
2010 establishments in Washington, D.C.